Although Puerto Rico does not participate in U.S. presidential general elections because it is an unincorporated territory and not a state, and therefore cannot send members to the U.S. Electoral College, Puerto Ricans are citizens of the United States and participate in the U.S. presidential primaries.

Democratic primary

Republican primary
The 2024 Puerto Rico Republican presidential primary will be held on March 10, 2024, where 23 delegates will be allocated on a winner-takes-most basis.

References

Notes

Puerto Rico
Puerto Rico presidential primaries
Presidential primaries